Princess Albertina is a female genital piercing, where a ring enters the urethra and exits through the top of the vagina. Anne Greenblatt described the Princess Albertina to Ralph H. in 1995 as a "relatively new and experimental piercing." Its name comes from the fact that it is analogous to the male Prince Albert piercing.

This is a relatively rare piercing, as placement is difficult and the potential for urinary tract infections (UTI) may be increased by this piercing. This piercing requires the bearer to have a large enough urethra for it to be viable. This piercing can be extremely sexually stimulating, as its presence stimulates the nerves of the urethra during intercourse or masturbation. It is an advanced piercing and many piercers may not be willing or able to perform it, largely due to the aforementioned concern about UTIs. While many male genital piercings are transurethral, the longer length of the male urethra reduces the risk of urinary tract infection due to transurethral piercings. The presence of this piercing can alter or divert the flow of urine from the body and may require extra attention during and after urination.

References

External links 
 Body Modification E-zine entry on Princess Albertina piercings

Female genital piercings